Carlo Tavecchio (13 July 1943 – 28 January 2023) was an Italian politician, sports executive, and administrator.

Career
For four legislatures, he held the office of Mayor of Ponte Lambro. For 15 years, he was president of an amateur company. From 1987 to 1992, he was Director of the Regional Committee of Lombardy. From 1992 to 1996, he was Vice President of the Lega Nazionale Dilettanti. Since 1996, he was Chairman of the Regional Committee of Lombardy. From 1999 to 2014, he was the position of President of the Lega Nazionale Dilettanti.

On 11 August 2014, Tavecchio was appointed president of the Italian Football Federation. On 6 March 2017, Tavecchio was re elected as president of the Italian Football Federation for a second term.

On 21 April 2017, Tavecchio was nominated commissioner of the Lega Serie A.

On 20 November 2017, Tavecchio resigned as Italian Football Federation president, seven days after Italy failed to qualify for the 2018 FIFA World Cup, the first time they failed to qualify for the World Cup since 1958.

Personal life and death
Tavecchio was married, with one daughter. He died on 28 January 2023, at the age of 79.

Controversies
On 7 October 2014, Tavecchio was banned by UEFA for racist remarks for six months: 

Tavecchio was not allowed to hold any position in UEFA, and was barred from the UEFA Congress of March 2015.

On 1 November 2015, an audio tape of Tavecchio became public, in which he disparaged Jews and gays.

Criminal record 
Tavecchio was tried and convicted five times since 1970.
In 1970, he was sentenced to four months for forgery of credit title
In 1994, he was sentenced to twenty eight months two days for tax evasion and value-added tax
In 1996, he was sentenced to three months for failure to pay social security deductions and insurance
In 1998, he was sentenced to three months for omission or falsification of reports
In 1998, he was sentenced to three months for abuse of office for violation of anti-pollution regulations

Notes

References

External links

1943 births
2023 deaths
Association football executives
Italian football chairmen and investors
Christian Democracy (Italy) politicians
Sportspeople from Monza